Bjarne Øen (6 November 1898 – 20 September 1994) was a Norwegian pilot, military officer  and  Lieutenant General of the Royal Norwegian Air Force.  During World War II he played a central role in building up the Royal Norwegian Air Force in Canada and the United Kingdom.  He served as Chief of Defence of Norway  from 1957 to 1963.

Biography
Adolf Bjarne Øen was born in Kristiania (now Oslo), Norway. He was the son of Ole O. Øen (1860–1927) and Marie Eline Stuve (1873–1964). He graduated from the Norwegian Military Academy in 1920, and from the Norwegian Military College in 1923. From 1923–1924, he was a student at Hæren Flight School, where he continued as an instructor until 1925. At the time of the start of World War II, Captain Øen was the airport manager of the newly opened Fornebu Airport outside Oslo.

After the Occupation of Norway by Nazi Germany in 1940, he was appointed temporary chief (General Inspector) for Norwegian Army Air Force. When the Norwegian Army Air Service training camp in southern Ontario  (Little Norway) was opened  November 1940, Øen was assigned to oversee training.  When Ole Reistad arrived at the camp in 1941, Øen was transferred to London as chief of staff to  Commander in Chief Hjalmar Riiser-Larsen. In 1942, Øen was promoted to Lieutenant Colonel.

The Royal Norwegian Air Force  was established as a separate arm of the Norwegian armed forces in 1944.  In January 1945 he conducted an inspection trip in Norway in preparation for the planned liberation of Norway. After the war,  Lieutenant General Øen took over the position of Chief of the Air Force, a position he held for five years. After that he was in charge of the Royal Norwegian Air Force Academy for three years.   He served as Chief of Defence of Norway (sjef for Forsvarsstaben) from 1957 to 1963.

Honors
In 1929, Øen received the King's Medal of Merit (Kongens fortjenstmedalje) in gold. In 1947 he was awarded the title of Commander with Star of the Royal Norwegian Order of St. Olav, for his war contributions. Among foreign awards, he also received the American Legion of Merit, the French  Légion d'honneur and was made a Honorary Commanders of the Order of the British Empire. He died during 1994 and was buried at Vestre gravlund in Oslo.

References

External links
Jens Chr. Hauge (2014) Tale for General Bjarne Øen på hans 95 års fødselsdag 6. november 1993 (Stiftelsen norsk Okkupasjonshistorie)

Related reading
Fredrik Meyer (1973)  Hærens og marinens flyvåpen : 1912–1945 (Oslo: Gyldendal) 
Per Conradi Hansen (2007)  Little Norway, a message of Liberty to the Hills of home (Military Historical Foundation of Eastern Norway) 

1898 births
1994 deaths
Military personnel from Oslo
Norwegian Military Academy alumni
Norwegian Army Air Service personnel of World War II
NATO military personnel
Norwegian military attachés
Royal Norwegian Air Force generals
Chiefs of Defence (Norway)
Foreign recipients of the Legion of Merit
Honorary Commanders of the Order of the British Empire
Recipients of the Legion of Honour
Recipients of the King's Medal of Merit in gold
Recipients of the Order of the Falcon
Burials at Vestre gravlund